Amir Zoleykani (born August 19, 1989) also transliterated as Zoleikani, is an Iranian football midfielder who plays for Foolad in the Persian Gulf Pro League.

Career

Club career statistics

References

External links
 
 

1989 births
Living people
Iranian footballers
Association football defenders
Association football wingers
People from Sari, Iran
Sportspeople from Sari, Iran
Foolad FC players
Sanat Naft Abadan F.C. players